The common butterfly lizard  (Leiolepis belliana), or simply the butterfly lizard, is a widespread species of lizard in the family Agamidae. The species is native to Asia.

Etymology
The specific name, belliana, is in honor of English zoologist Thomas Bell.

Geographic range
L. belliana can be found in the forests of Cambodia, Indonesia, Malaysia, Myanmar, Thailand, and Vietnam.

Description
L. belliana is known for the beautiful patterns on its back and sides. It has yellow spots on its back, and small orange and black lines on its sides.

Habitat
L. belliana lives on land that has been prepared for agricultural uses, as well as open sandy land along the coasts.

Ecology

Reproduction
L. belliana is monogamous, with a single adult pair inhabiting the same burrow, where 3-8 eggs are laid during hot, dry weather. This species also exhibits parental care of neonates, with neonates sharing their parents' burrow for a few months before digging their own burrow nearby.

Diet
The butterfly lizard feeds on vegetation, crabs, grasshoppers, beetle larvae, butterflies, and other insects.

Habitat
These burrows are also used during reproduction and as refuge from weather and fires.

Invasive species in Florida
The Miami population of L. belliana originated from a tropical fish dealer, and the population was already well established in 1992. L. belliana is readily available in the pet trade, and reptile collectors are probably not exploiting the Miami population because this species is located on private properties in a residential area, difficult to catch, and not worth much as individuals typically wholesale for $3.50–5.50 each. The ecological impacts of L. belliana on native species in Florida are unknown.

References

Further reading
Hardwicke T, Gray JE (1827). "A Synopsis of the Species of Saurian Reptiles, collected in India by Major-General Hardwicke". Zoological Journal [London] 3: 213–229. (Uromastix belliana, new species, p. 220).
Smith MA (1935). The Fauna of British India, Including Ceylon and Burma. Reptilia and Amphibia. Vol. II.—Sauria. London: Secretary of State for India in Council. (Taylor and Francis, printers). xiii + 440 pp. + Plate I + 2 maps. (Leiolepis belliana, pp. 238–240, Figure 61).

Gallery

External links
Common butterfly lizard

Leiolepis
Lizards of Asia
Reptiles described in 1827
Taxa named by Thomas Hardwicke
Taxa named by John Edward Gray